Eric O. Kokish (born 1947) is a Canadian professional bridge player, writer, and coach from Montreal.

Kokish graduated from McGill University.

In 1978, Kokish finished second in the World Open Pairs.

Kokish has been the coach of Nick Nickell's professional team for many years. He first worked as coach for the Brazil national team in 1985 and later coached the Indonesia team briefly, a stint interrupted by political unrest in Jakarta. Around the Indonesia job he and his family relocated from Montreal to Toronto.

Kokish was inducted into the ACBL Hall of Fame in 2011.
Kokish was inducted into the Canadian Bridge Federation's Hall of Fame.

In major  competition, he is a five-time winner of the Canadian National Teams Championship (Flight A), all during the time from 1980 to 1999 when the winner routinely represented Canada in that year's or next year's world championship tournament, or in a preliminary Tri-Country Playoff with Mexico and Bermuda. Thus he played on Canada teams in the 1980 Olympiad, 1982 Rosenblum, 1986 Rosenblum, 1995 Bermuda Bowl, and 1996 Olympiad. Those teams won a bronze medal in the 1982 Rosenblum Cup and a silver medal in the Bermuda Bowl. George Mittelman was also a member of all five teams.

Bridge accomplishments

Honors

 ACBL Hall of Fame, 2011

Awards

 Blackwood Award 2011

Wins

 North American Bridge Championships (2)
 Vanderbilt (1) 1974 
 Mitchell Board-a-Match Teams (1) 1978

Runners-up

 World Open Pairs Championship (1) 1978
 North American Bridge Championships
 Vanderbilt (1) 1980 
 Mitchell Board-a-Match Teams (1) 1974 
 Reisinger (1) 1982 
 Spingold (1) 1982

References

External links
  – with audio-video interview
 
 Bridge Kids: Eric Kokish, the top bridge coach in the world audio-video recording at YouTube (uploaded August 8, 2010)
 Eric Kokish interviewed at the 14th Red Bull World Bridge Series held in Sanyo, Japan (uploaded October 30, 2014) 
  
  [temporary here, as the auto-generated WorldCat link below is not yet active 2015-01-31]

1947 births
Contract bridge writers
Canadian contract bridge players
Bermuda Bowl players
McGill University alumni
Writers from Montreal
Living people
Date of birth missing (living people)
Place of birth missing (living people)